Karji may refer to:
 Karji, Firuzeh
 Karji, Nishapur